Lisa Hill may refer to:

 Lisa Christina Hill, girl who inspired the novel Bridge to Terabithia
 Lisa Hill (political scientist), professor of politics at the University of Adelaide, Australia
 Lisa Katharina Hill, German artistic gymnast